The Association of Graphic Workers of Yugoslavia (SGRJ) was a trade union representing workers in the printing industry in Yugoslavia.

The union was established in December 1920, bringing together various local unions, of which the most important was the Croatian Typographic Society, founded in 1870.  As a result, the union was based in Zagreb.  The union was almost immediately banned, but was legalised in September 1921, after it promised not to permit communists to hold leadership positions.

In 1933, the union was reorganised as an umbrella body for five national bodies.  As of 1935, the Serbian body alone had around 2,000 members.  The union was banned in 1941.

References

Printing trade unions
Trade unions established in 1920
Trade unions disestablished in 1941
Trade unions in Yugoslavia